Thioredoxin-interacting protein is a protein that in humans is encoded by the TXNIP gene.

Interactions 

TXNIP has been shown to interact with Thioredoxin and ZBTB32.

Related gene problems
TAR syndrome
1q21.1 deletion syndrome
1q21.1 duplication syndrome

References

Further reading